Chandra Mukhi is a 1993 Indian Hindi-language fantasy drama film directed by Debaloy Dey starring Sridevi, Salman Khan, Mohnish Behl and Pran.

Summary 
Chandra Mukhi tells the story of Chandra Mukhi (Sridevi), a princess of a heavenly kingdom, who comes down to earth in search of her lost magical leaf. A boy named Raja (Salman Khan) gets the same magical leaf and the adventure starts. It is a remake of Supergirl (1984) starring Helen Slater in the lead role.

Cast 
Sridevi as Chandra Mukhi
Salman Khan as Raja Rai
Pran as Rai (Raja's  grandfather)
Gulshan Grover as Madan (Raja's Uncle)
Mohnish Behl as Tony
Puneet Issar as Zhola
Tinnu Anand as Santala
Kunika as Lily
Maya Alagh as Chandra Mukhi's mom
Asha Sachdev as Kamini Rai
Tej Sapru as Ghunga
Shiva Rindani as Bob
Avtaar Gill as Yakeemo
Rana Jung Bahadur as Ved
Kim Yashpal as special appearance in song (deleted song)

Soundtrack

References

External links 
 

1993 films
1990s fantasy drama films
1990s Hindi-language films
1990s Urdu-language films
Films scored by Anand–Milind
Indian fantasy drama films
Hindi remakes of Telugu films
1993 drama films
Urdu-language Indian films